Luen Wo Hui is one of the 17 constituencies in the North District, Hong Kong.

The constituency returns one district councillor to the North District Council, with an election every four years. The seat is held by Chow Kam Ho of Luen Wo United as of 2021.

Luen Wo Hui constituency is loosely based on area of Luen Wo Hui, including Grand Regentville, Regentville, Wing Fai Centre, Wing Fok Centre and Fanling Garden in Fanling with estimated population of 20,753.

Councillors represented

Election results

2010s

2000s

1990s

1980s

References

Fanling
Constituencies of Hong Kong
Constituencies of North District Council
1982 establishments in Hong Kong
Constituencies established in 1982